Docebo is a software as a service company that specializes in learning management system. Docebo was founded in 2005. Its product Docebo Learn LMS is compatible with Sharable Content Object Reference Model (SCORM) 1.2 and 2004 as well as Tin Can. The program operates as a cloud-hosted software as a service platform as well as being third-party compatible. It currently runs version 7.5. DoceboLMS is available in more than 40 languages. 

In October 2018, Docebo released their learning-specific artificial intelligence algorithms into the learning platform that are powered by a combination of machine learning, deep learning and natural language processing to produce an automated and holistic approach to learning (formal LMS, experiential and social) that drives growth, organizational performance, and revenue.

History

Docebo was founded in 2005 by Claudio Erba, who was previously an IT consultant at the University of Florence, where he developed a storage solution that developed into the company's current software. 

In 2012, Docebo received its first round of funding from Italian venture capital firm Principia SGR. Later that same year, Docebo opened an office in Athens, Georgia.

Docebo's second venture-backed financing round came from Canadian firm Klass Capital in 2016, funding its continued North American expansion with the opening of an office in Toronto, Ontario.

Docebo became a public company following initial public offerings on the Toronto Stock Exchange in October 2019 and the Nasdaq Global Select Market in December 2020.

In March 2023, Docebo announced a partnership with US corporate learning technology and custom training company ELB Learning. The partnership aims to enhance both learning provider experiences by combining Docebo's training platform and ELB's content and courses as both companies agree to co market their products.

References

External links
 

Companies listed on the Nasdaq
Companies listed on the Toronto Stock Exchange
Learning management systems
Virtual learning environments